The 2018 Evolution Championship Series (commonly referred to as Evo 2018 or EVO 2018) was a fighting game event held in Las Vegas on August 3 to 5 as part of the long-running Evolution Championship Series. The event offered tournaments for various video games, including Street Fighter V, Tekken 7, and Dragon Ball FighterZ. Over 10,000 people registered for the event with Dragon Ball FighterZ receiving the most entrants.

Venue
Just like the previous edition of the event, Evo 2018 took place in the Mandalay Bay resort for all three days of the event. The first two days of the event were held at the Mandalay Bay Convention Center, and the final day was held at the Mandalay Bay Events Center.

Games

The eight games played at Evo 2018 were announced on February 6, 2018, during a special announcement stream on Twitch, with event co-founder Joey Cuellar discussing the inclusion of each game. The games set to be contested consisted of new releases, FGC contemporaries, and updated releases. New additions included BlazBlue: Cross Tag Battle and Dragon Ball FighterZ while Street Fighter V: Arcade Edition would replace Street Fighter V. Regarding the Smash community, Super Smash Bros. Melee'''s finals are once again being held during the Sunday Finals, contrast to its Saturday spot in the previous year. For the third consecutive year, the Street Fighter V: Arcade Edition tournament will be a Capcom Pro Tour Premier event.

The eight games being competed in officially at Evo 2018 were:Street Fighter V: Arcade EditionTekken 7Guilty Gear Xrd REV 2Injustice 2Super Smash Bros. MeleeSuper Smash Bros. for Wii UDragon Ball FighterZBlazBlue: Cross Tag BattleWhen asked about the exclusion of Marvel vs. Capcom: Infinite, Joey Cuellar responded: “I don’t think people are playing it, and that’s the problem”. This statement is a reflection of the title's status as a commercial failure. A side tournament for the game has been conducted, however.

Side events
Evo featured competitions for many additional games as side events, such as Fighting EX Layer, Ultra Street Fighter IV, Super Street Fighter II Turbo, and Marvel vs. Capcom: Infinite. Exhibitions for then-upcoming fighters Dead or Alive 6, Super Smash Bros. Ultimate and Soulcalibur VI also took place.

As with the previous three years, the AnimEVO series of side tournaments, which is dedicated to airdasher fighting games, was held at the event with over twenty-six games to compete in, including Under Night In-Birth EXE: Late(st), Samurai Shodown V Special, Garou: Mark of the Wolves, Windjammers, and Catherine, as well as former EVO titles The King of Fighters XIV, BlazBlue: Central Fiction, Persona 4 Arena Ultimax and Tatsunoko vs. Capcom.

Participants
The Evolution Championship Series has historically been the largest fighting game tournament in the world, allowing free registration for anyone who wants to compete. Registration for the event closed on July 20, which Joey "Mr. Wizard" Cuellar had announced the final registration numbers. The three largest games from last year: Street Fighter V, Super Smash Bros. for Wii U, and Super Smash Bros. Melee have once again seen decreases in numbers with the games going from 2622 to 2421, 1515 to 1303, and 1435 to 1302 respectively. Dragon Ball FighterZ became the first game in years to surpass the entrant numbers of a Street Fighter game becoming the most entered game at Evo 2018, the first for a non-Street Fighter game. Tekken 7 once again saw an increase in entrant numbers going from over 1,200 entrants to 1,504 becoming the third largest game at the event.

Evo 2018 has received over 11,000 attendees in competition.

Broadcasting

As with every year since Evo 2012, the entire tournament is streamed through the Twitch streaming service. The tournament is broadcast across eight different streams: seven Evo-run streams provide coverage of all games throughout the weekend, while Capcom runs its signature Capcom Fighters stream that features coverage of Street Fighter V matches on Friday and Saturday. The EVO1 channel provides coverage of the show The Jump Off, which airs on EVO6 whenever an exhibition or Top 8 takes place.

Reveals
Although it was not revealed at the event, during the Evo 2018 lineup reveal, Arc System Works announced Yang Xiao Long from RWBY as a DLC character for BlazBlue: Cross Tag Battle. Along with her announcement, the company stated that she and Blake Belladonna would be released free-of-charge, which would allow players to play as Team RWBY without having to pay for them.

On the Saturday of the tournament, to coincide with the game's inclusion among the AnimEVO side events, DotEmu announced a port of Windjammers for the Nintendo Switch. Shortly after the BlazBlue: Cross Tag Battle finals ended, Arc System Works revealed nine new characters for the title to be released as DLC on August 6: Izayoi, Nine the Phantom, and Mai Natsume of BlazBlue; Mitsuru Kirijo, Akihiko Sanada and Labrys of Persona 4 Arena; and Merkava, Yuzuriha Sougets, and Mika Returna of Under Night In-Birth. In addition, following the Fighting EX Layer side tournament, Arika revealed the game would be receiving an arcade port and announced a release window for forthcoming characters Pullum Purna and Vulcano Rosso. They also teased returning Street Fighter EX characters Area and Sharon and guest character Terry Bogard of Fatal Fury and The King of Fighters as future DLC.

Following Sunday's Guilty Gear Xrd REV 2 finals, Arc System Works announced an organized eSports circuit with the reveal of the ArcRevo World Tour. The circuit will focus on Guilty Gear Xrd REV 2, BlazBlue: Cross Tag Battle, and BlazBlue: Central Fiction. Prior to the Super Smash Bros. Melee grand final, Nintendo announced a special Nintendo Direct presentation for Super Smash Bros. Ultimate, which was later streamed on August 8. Before the Tekken 7 finals, Bandai Namco announced that Astaroth and Seong Mi-na would be playable in Soulcalibur VI./ At the end of the finals, series producer Katsuhiro Harada announced a second season of DLC for the Tekken 7, including six new playable characters. Three characters were revealed at the event: returning fighters Anna Williams and Lei Wulong, and special guest character Negan from The Walking Dead. After the Dragon Ball FighterZ finals concluded, Bandai Namco announced an August 8 release date for the game's fifth and sixth DLC characters, base form Goku and Vegeta, as well as a reveal trailer for the seventh DLC character, Cooler. Finally, just before the Street Fighter V'' finals, Capcom showed the first gameplay of the remaining two Season 3 DLC characters, G and Sagat, and confirmed they would be released the next day.

Results

References

External links

2018 fighting game tournaments
2018 in sports in Nevada
Evolution Championship Series
Esports competitions in the United States